Loris Damonte (born 5 August 1990) is an Italian professional football player currently playing for Serie D team Ligorna.

Club career
On 31 August 2016 Damonte was sold to fellow Lega Pro club Sambenedettese in a 1-year contract, with Nadir Minotti moved to Pistoiese.

On 9 July 2018, he was signed by Albissola.

On 29 July 2019, he joined Renate.

On 12 July 2021, Damonte signed for Feralpisalò.

References

External links
 
 

1990 births
People from Savona
Footballers from Liguria
Living people
Italian footballers
Association football midfielders
Serie B players
Serie C players
Genoa C.F.C. players
U.S. Alessandria Calcio 1912 players
S.S.D. Varese Calcio players
A.C.R. Messina players
U.S. Pistoiese 1921 players
A.S. Sambenedettese players
U.S. Gavorrano players
Albissola 2010 players
A.C. Renate players
FeralpiSalò players
Sportspeople from the Province of Savona